or  is a lake in the municipality of Lierne in Trøndelag county, Norway. The  lake lies in the northern part of the municipality, just south of the large lake Tunnsjøen.

See also
List of lakes in Norway

References

Lierne
Lakes of Trøndelag